The 1816 Indiana gubernatorial election took place on August 5, 1816, under the provisions of the recently ratified Constitution of Indiana. It was the first gubernatorial election in the State of Indiana. Jonathan Jennings, the longtime U.S. territorial delegate from Indiana and president of the state's constitutional convention, defeated Thomas Posey, the incumbent territorial governor, with 56.9% of the vote. The election was held concurrently with elections for lieutenant governor and members of the Indiana General Assembly.

At the time of the election, the Democratic-Republican Party was dominant nationally following the War of 1812, and the politics of the new state were conducted on a nonpartisan basis. Geographic factionalism and the personal reputation of the candidates provided the ammunition with which the campaign would be fought. In spite of this, the campaign was spirited: of the barely more than 12,000 eligible voters, more than 9,000 cast ballots in the gubernatorial election.

Jennings was well known to the voting public, having represented the Indiana Territory in the United States Congress for more than half a decade. A resident of Clark County, he was associated with the Eastern faction in territorial politics and a leading opponent of slavery. In a campaign typical of the era, he presented his visits with voters as personal in nature in order to avoid the appearance of electioneering. Posey, the incumbent, was unpopular and, due to his absence from the territorial capital in Corydon, lacked the necessary political connections to wage an effective campaign. On election day, Jennings defeated Posey handily by a margin of well over 1,000 votes.

Results

Results by county
The official election returns appear to have been lost. The Vincennes Western Sun in its editions of August 17 and 24, 1816 gives the returns of four of the state's fifteen counties as follows.

References

Bibliography

Political history of Indiana
1816